Ayden Owens-Delerme (born 28 May 2000) is a Puerto Rican decathlete. He finished fourth at the 2022 World Athletics Championships.

Professional
Despite being born and raised in the United States, Owens-Delerme represents Puerto Rico on the international stage, as his family on his mother's side are Puerto Rican and he visited the island yearly in his childhood.

Competing at the 2022 World Athletics Championships decathlon in Eugene, Oregon, Owens-Delerme was placed third overall after the 100 metres, shot put and long jump events and took the lead overnight after a personal best 45.07 in the 400m. After subpar second-day performances in the javelin and pole vault, he fell behind eventual champion Kevin Mayer and others, eventually finishing 4th.

NCAA
Owens-Delerme was a grad of North Allegheny before attending University of Southern California where he was named Pac-12 Freshman of the Year, and then University of Michigan where he earned Big Ten Field Athlete of the Year, before transferring to the University of Arkansas for whom he won the 2022 NCAA championship decathlon, following which he was named the 2022 SEC Field Athlete of the Year. Owens-Delerme graduated with a BS Biomedical Engineering from University of Michigan in 2021 and will graduate from University of Arkansas Walton College of Business MBA program.

Owens-Delerme is an 5-time NCAA Division 1 All-American, 2-time NCAA Champion, 1-time Big Ten Conference Champion, 1-time Pac-12 Conference, and 15-time All-Conference finalist.

Prep
Owens is 2018 Gatorade Pennsylvania Men's Track and Field Athlete of the Year. Owens-Delerme concluded his prep career ranked Top 10 nationally in seven different track events.
Owen is a 2018 Pennsylvania Interscholastic Athletic Association state champion in the 110 meters hurdles (13.69), 300 meters hurdles (36.68), 200 meters and finished second in the long jump  representing North Allegheny Senior High School at Seth Grove Stadium in Shippensburg, Pennsylvania. At the 2018 PIAA Class AAA meet, Owens-Delerme won three events and finished second in another, single-handedly winning the state title for North Allegheny.
Owens is a four-time New Balance National All-American and won the 2018 New Balance indoor 60 meters hurdles title with a state-record time of 7.59 and was the decathlon champion at the 2017 New Balance Nationals Outdoor.

Early life
Born in Pittsburgh, Pennsylvania, Owens-Delerme first came to broad recognition as a multi-sport athlete at statewide athletic powerhouse North Allegheny in suburban Wexford. Michael Owens, Ayden Owens-Delerme's father, captained the 1980 basketball team at University of Virginia.

References

2000 births
Living people
Puerto Rican male track and field athletes
Male track and field athletes of insular areas of the United States
21st-century Puerto Rican people
Puerto Rican decathletes
Track and field athletes from Pennsylvania
Sportspeople from Pittsburgh
USC Trojans men's track and field athletes
Michigan Wolverines men's track and field athletes
Arkansas Razorbacks men's track and field athletes
University of Michigan alumni